Karan Rastogi and Divij Sharan won the first edition of this tournament. They defeated Jan Hernych and Jürgen Zopp 3–6, 7–6(7–3), [13–11] in the final.

Seeds

Draw

Draw

References
 Main Draw

Ningbo Challenger - Doubles
2011 Men's Doubles